

Events
 With resentment toward Europeans at an all-time high, Chinese triads reach their peak numbering over 3,600 although many of the groups are limited to local villages or clans.
 Early Cantonese criminals, who will eventually form the first of the New York Tongs, soon began arriving in the city after the success of the Cantonese gambler Wah Kee, who had been operating illegal gambling parlors and opium dens since the 1870s, in the New York district of what will later be known as Chinatown. The Chinese population steadily begins to climb to several hundred, compared to only 12 as of 1872, as the predominantly German and smaller Irish population slowly become driven out of the neighborhoods of Doyers, Mott, and Pell Streets as a result of the large immigration of Chinese immigrants which by 1910 will number more than 10,000.
 January 13 - Robert Suffrage, a 19-year-old carpenter and member of the Stable Gang, is sentenced to two years and three months imprisonment at New York State Prison for stealing the gold watch of a Dennis McGuinness the previous October. While being taken to The Tombs, Suffrage attacked the arresting officer and was immediately taken back to the courtroom where he was indicted of assault in less than ten minutes.
 February 10 – Edward and John Brady (criminal), leaders of the Brady Gang, are arrested along with four others including Hugh Brady (or John Osborne) and Thomas Brady (or Thomas Halligan), Edward Carrol, Michael Hammel and Harmond Clark (the latter two suspected of running moonshine from New York to the Palisades) and for operating an illegal distillery. With the exception of Clark who was acquitted due to lack of evidence, the remaining members were convicted and given a suspended sentence as they had been held in custody for the past ten months.
 February 29 – New York police officer Thomas M. Stone is severely beaten by members of the Smoky Hollow Gang while attempting to arrest a gang member loitering on Columbia Street. Surrounded by several gang members, Stone was relieved of his billy club and repeatedly kicked and assaulted, with some of the members going so far as to jump on his body after the officer had lost consciousness, until bystanders interfered after one member was stopped from attempting to use a heavy piece of paving stone to crush the officers skull in. Although later apprehended and held at Raymond Street Jail, Stone later died of his injuries while at Long Island College Hospital on the evening of April 1 and was speculated in the press that the gang members would receive leniency due to their political connections to Democratic politicians in the Brooklyn's Sixth Ward.
 April 26 – Several weeks after the death of police officer Thomas Stone, a Sgt. Walsh is attacked by members of the Smoky Hollow Gang while attempting to arrest Edward Glynn for disorderly conduct. While initially outnumbered, several bystanders including his uncle Frank Walsh came to his assistance and arrested another of his assailants John Mungerford. Mungerford, a brother of the gang member officer Stone had attempted to arrest, was charged as an accomplice in the patrolman's murder.
 May 5 – John "Little Andy" Anderson, a former member of the Dutch Mob, is arrested by a police detective on the corner of Prince Street and The Bowery. Although he attempted to fire a revolver at the arresting officer, he was disarmed and taken into custody on suspicion of a recent robbery which had taken place at the Michell, Myers & Co. on Second Avenue six days earlier. While over $1,500 in jewellery is found in his possession, he denied his involvement in the robbery claiming the jewelry had been given to him and is released under a $5,000 bail following his arraignment at the Tombs Police Court. The money and jewelry which had claimed was his property including a diamond pin, an amethyst ring, $65 in cash and his revolver were returned to him upon his release.
 July 15 – A brawl between rival members of the Eightieth and Ninetieth Street Gangs along the traverse road in Central Park near 85th Street is broken up by police. Although officers from the Central Park Police, the 31st Precinct and the 88th Street Stationhouse were preparing to apprehend the nearly 200 gang members in attendance, a local patrolman accidentally stumbled across the fight and blew his whistle before officers were in place. With the crowd alerted to the presence of police, only nine men were taken into custody including William Olive, Jeremiah Collins, William Swan, John Lahey, John McNamara, John Lynch, Bernard McHugh, Peter Murray and Coneilius Sullivan who were held in custody at the 23rd Precinct Police Station.
 August 11 – John Collins and John Murphy, members of the Portland Street Gang, are arrested by two police officers after a hard chase. Taken into custody, they are both charged with robbing a Daniel Reardon of Eastport, Maine.
 September 30 – The body of John D. "Travelling Mike" Grady is found in his Sixth Avenue office. Several relatives suspect foul play, as he was recovering from an attack of pneumonia lasting some months; however an autopsy report confirms he died of cardiac congestion.

Arts and literature

Births
 James Alderman, Florida bootlegger

Deaths
 September 30 – John D. Grady "Travelling Mike", New York criminal and leader of the Grady Gang

References

Organized crime
Years in organized crime